"If You Were Here Tonight" is a song written by Monte Moir and recorded by American recording artist Alexander O'Neal. It is the second single from the singer's self-titled debut solo album, Alexander O'Neal (1985). Following the successful chart performances of the single "Innocent", "If You Were Here Tonight" was released as the album's second single.

"If You Were Here Tonight" is a melancholy ballad about the break-up of a relationship. It is the only song out of three songs on the album written and produced by Monte Moir to be released as a single.

Chart performance
The song was O'Neal's first successful solo single in the United Kingdom, reaching No. 13 on the UK Singles Chart in March 1986. It had originally peaked at No. 81 in August 1985, but following the top ten success of the Cherrelle duet "Saturday Love", the single re-entered the charts in early 1986. It remains one of his most aired songs on British radio.

In the US, the song became his second R&B hit, reaching No. 17 on the Hot Black Singles chart.  It was also one of his only two hits to chart in Ireland (reaching No. 20).

Track listing
12" maxi (TBUA 12.6391, A 12.6391)
"If You Were Here Tonight" - 6:08
"What's Missing" - 5:42
"If You Were Here Tonight (Soft Version)" - 5:06

12" single (TA 6391)
"If You Were Here Tonight" - 6:08
"Innocent (Instrumental)" - 9:54
"If You Were Here Tonight (Soft Version)" - 5:06

7" single (A 6391)
"If You Were Here Tonight (Remix)" - 3:40
"If You Were Here Tonight (Soft Version)" - 5:06

Sales chart performance

Peak positions

Cover versions

Jamaican reggae singer Wayne Wonder covered the song in 1990, retitled "If You Were Here", taken from his self-titled debut album released the same year.
English singer Matt Goss, formerly of the band Bros, released his version as a single in 1996.
Jamaican reggae singer Tony Curtis recorded a cover of the song in 1998, which is included on the Sail Away album.
British R&B singer Tony Momrelle also covered the song in 1998, with UK garage mixes by Daryl B and Mark Yardley (of Stanton Warriors) proving to be popular the following year.
English singer Shayne Ward covered the song in 2015 which is included on the Deluxe Edition of the album, Closer.

Sampling

The song's instrumental was sampled as the basis for the highly popular dancehall beat called the "Sail Away Riddim" in 1998. This was done by producing an uptempo dancehall beat woven around the airy keyboard riff from "If You Were Here Tonight". The Sail Away riddim was used to produce a 12-track "one-rhythm" album of songs using the same instrumental. Artists featured on the Sail Away album include Beenie Man, Mr. Vegas, Chico, Frisco Kid, Sean Paul, Richie Stephens, T.O.K., Nitty Kutchie, Round Head, Copper Cat, Demo Delgado, and Tony Curtis with his version of "If You Were Here Tonight".
The song was sampled by John Forté on the song "Move On (I'm Leavin')" from the soundtrack to the 1997 motion picture Sprung.
It was sampled by Ras Kass on the song "It Is What It Is" from his 1998 album Rasassination.
American rapper Freddie Gibbs sampled the song in 2013 for his song, "The Color Purple".
Oakland-based rapper Lil B sampled the song for his song "Thugs Pain (Remix)" from the mixtape 100% Gutta.
Barbadian singer Rihanna sampled the song in her 2016 song "Work", which reached number one in the United States.

References

1985 singles
Alexander O'Neal songs
Songs written by Monte Moir
Contemporary R&B ballads
1985 songs
Tabu Records singles
Soul ballads
Songs about heartache
1980s ballads